David Coutts Seath  (31 March 1914 – 18 October 1997) was a New Zealand politician of the National Party.

Biography

Seath was born in Musselburgh, Scotland. He received his education at Waihi District High School, Waihi School of Mines, and the University of Edinburgh. From 1937, he was a public accountant in Taumarunui. During World War II, he was with the Royal New Zealand Naval Volunteer Reserve (RNZNVR), and served as Lieutenant Commander with British naval forces.

He was Mayor of Taumarunui from 1953 to 1955. In 1960 Seath was appointed as Parliamentary Under-Secretary to the Minister of Finance, and held that position from 12 December 1960 to 24 January 1962.

In 1963 Seath was appointed as Minister of Internal Affairs, and held the position from 20 December 1963 to 9 February 1972, when the Marshall Ministry replaced the second Holyoake Ministry. He was described as a nervous man easily frightened by Holyoake.

He was a Member of the Executive Council (initially as an Undersecretary) from 24 January 1962 to 9 February 1972. In 1972 Seath was granted the right to retain the title of Honourable for life.

Notes

References

Who’s Who in New Zealand (1968, 9th edition)

1914 births
1997 deaths
New Zealand National Party MPs
New Zealand accountants
People from Musselburgh
Mayors of places in Manawatū-Whanganui
Scottish emigrants to New Zealand
Alumni of the University of Edinburgh
Members of the New Zealand House of Representatives
New Zealand military personnel of World War II
New Zealand MPs for North Island electorates
Members of the Cabinet of New Zealand
20th-century New Zealand politicians